Gwiazdoń (meaning "of stars") is a Polish surname, also found in Belarus and parts of Russia. It may have been a surname given to early shamanistic astronomers to the Pole tribes.

Many Gwiazdoń or Gwiazdon families live in the southern part of Poland, in the region of Zakopane and Nowy Targ. This surname appears also in the United States, but generally only among third- and fourth-generation Polish-Americans.

Surnames
Surnames of Polish origin